Anna Weinberg is a psychologist, currently a Canada Research Chair in Clinical Neuroscience at McGill University. 

Weinberg obtained a Bachelor of Arts degree at Wesleyan University in 2000; she completed graduate studies in clinical psychology at Stony Brook University, earning a Master of Arts degree in 2009 and a Ph.D. in  2014. She joined McGill as an Assistant Professor in 2015. Her research focuses on identifying biological pathways  (using such methods as ERPs) that are involved in emotional functioning and dysfunction.

References

Year of birth missing (living people)
Living people
Academic staff of McGill University

Canadian women psychologists
Canadian women neuroscientists
Canadian neuroscientists
Stony Brook University alumni
Wesleyan University alumni